Grisse is a historical drama television miniseries developed for HBO Asia by Mike Wiluan.

Cast 

 Adinia Wirasti as Kalia
 Marthino Lio as Maran
 Michael Wahr as Moresby
 Joanne Kam as Chi
 Zack Lee as Jambu
 Toshiji Takeshima as Ryuichi
 Edward Akbar as Adnan
 Ully Triani as Lena
 Tom De Jong as De Witt
 Hossan Leong as Zengwei
 Wafda Saifan as Bakda
Kelly Tandiono as Hidayat
Alexandra Gottardo as Harsha

Episodes

Production

Development 
Grisse was developed by HBO Asia in collaboration with Infinite Studios, a Singapore-based company.

Casting 
The cast includes actors from Singapore, Malaysia, Indonesia, Japan and Europe.

Filming 
Principal photography on the eight-episode series began in May 2018.

References 

2018 Singaporean television series debuts
2018 Singaporean television series endings
English-language television shows
Television series set in the 19th century